XHNUC-FM 105.1 is a radio station in Cancún, Quintana Roo, known as Radio Turquesa. It is owned by Gastón Alegre López, a longtime radio entrepreneur, hotel owner, and PRD politician in the state.

XHNUC "Radio Turquesa" is not to be confused with sister station XHCANQ-FM 102.7 "Turquesa Pop", which is commonly owned but a noncommercial (permit) station.

Radio Turquesa is heard statewide and in parts of Yucatán on several repeaters and additional stations owned by Grupo Turquesa.

Repeaters
XHNUC-FM is the only station in Mexico to have non-co-channel repeaters on the same concession. Authorized in the 1990s, the network gives XHNUC coverage of key population centers in Quintana Roo. In 1999, the network was partially closed in evident political retribution for Alegre's candidacy for Governor of Quintana Roo; a federal court ordered the transmitters returned to service in 2000, ruling that the state branch of the Secretariat of Communications and Transportation acted incorrectly.

Satellite stations
These stations air Radio Turquesa programming but have separate concessions. Grupo Turquesa won these stations in the IFT-4 radio station auction of 2017.

References

External links
Radio Turquesa homepage
Player online
 https://stream.miradio.in:9414/live

Radio stations in Quintana Roo